Gaël Le Bohec (born 4 November 1977) is a French politician of La République En Marche! (LREM) who served as a member of the French National Assembly from 2017 to 2022, representing the department of Ille-et-Vilaine.

Early career
Le Bohec was born in Nantes and first worked in the industrial sector with large companies. In 2015, he founded a company that helps hospitals with management and organizing stocks. He also teaches Logistics and Support Processes at the EHESP.

Political career
In parliament, Le Bohec served on the Committee on Cultural Affairs and Education. In addition to his committee assignments, he was part of the French Parliamentary Friendship Group with São Tomé and Príncipe.

On 3 May 2022, Le Bohec announced that he would be standing down at the 2022 French legislative election.

Other activities
 Agence France-Presse (AFP), Member of the Supervisory Board (since 2017)

Political positions
In July 2019, Le Bohec voted in favor of the French ratification of the European Union’s Comprehensive Economic and Trade Agreement (CETA) with Canada.

References

1977 births
Living people
Deputies of the 15th National Assembly of the French Fifth Republic
La République En Marche! politicians
Members of Parliament for Ille-et-Vilaine